Angel Face may refer to:

Arts
 Angel Face (1953 film), a black-and-white film noir directed by Otto Preminger
 Angel Face (1998 film), an Argentine film written and directed by Pablo Torre
 Angel Face (2008 film), a short film written and directed by Cecile Cinco
 Angel Face (2018 film), French film
 Angel Face, a 1919 Broadway musical by Victor Herbert
 Angel Face, a 2000 EP by Eric Sardinas
 Angel Face, a character in the 1996 novel Fight Club and its 1999 film adaptation
 "Angel Face", a 1974 single by The Glitter Band

Other uses
 Rosa 'Angel Face', a type of rose
 Angel Face (cocktail), made from gin, apricot brandy and calvados